Delta County is a county in the Upper Peninsula in the U.S. state of Michigan. As of the 2020 Census, the population was 36,903. The county seat is Escanaba. The county was surveyed in 1843 and organized in 1861. Its name originates from the Greek letter delta (Δ), which refers to the triangular shape of the original county which included segments of Menominee, Dickinson, Iron, and Marquette counties. Recreation and forest products are major industries, and crops include hay, corn, small grains, potatoes, and strawberries.

Delta County comprises the Escanaba, MI Micropolitan Statistical Area.

Geography
It is the fifth-largest county in Michigan by land area.

Adjacent counties
By land
 Menominee County (southwest, Central Time Zone border)
 Marquette County (northwest)
 Alger County (north)
 Schoolcraft County (east)
By water

 Leelanau County (southeast)
 Door County, Wisconsin (south, Central Time Zone border)

National protected area
 Hiawatha National Forest (part)

Demographics

The 2010 United States Census indicates Delta County had population of 37,069. This decrease of 1,451 people from the 2000 United States Census represents a 3.8% population decrease during that 10-year period. In 2010 there were 15,992 households and 10,381 families in the county. The population density was 31.7 per square mile (12.2 per km2). There were 20,214 housing units at an average density of 17.3 per square mile (6.7 per km2). 94.7% of the population were White, 2.4% Native American, 0.4% Asian, 0.2% Black or African American, 0.2% of some other race and 2.1% of two or more races. 0.9% were Hispanic or Latino (of any race). 20.8% were of French, French Canadian or Cajun, 15.5% German, 10.3% Swedish and 7.6% Irish ancestry.

There were 15,992 households, out of which 25.5% had children under the age of 18 living with them, 51.7% were husband and wife families, 8.8% had a female householder with no husband present, 35.1% were non-families, and 29.8% were made up of individuals. The average household size was 2.28 and the average family size was 2.80.

The county population contained 20.9% under age of 18, 7.3% from 18 to 24, 21.1% from 25 to 44, 31.6% from 45 to 64, and 19.1% who were 65 years of age or older. The median age was 46 years. 49.5% of the population were male, and 50.5% of the population female.

The 2010 American Community Survey 3-year estimate indicates the median income for a household in the county was $40,967 and the median income for a family was $49,557. Males had a median income of $28,702 versus $15,093 for females. The per capita income for the county was $21,751. About 2.4% of families and 13.2% of the population were below the poverty line, including 17.4% of those under the age 18 and 8.5% of those age 65 or over.

Transportation

Major highways
  runs east–west through the lower part of the county, entering from Schoolcraft County east of Garden Corners and running westward to an intersection with US 41 at Rapid River.
  runs north–south through central part of the county, entering from Alger County at Trenary, running southerly to Rapid River then southwesterly along the Lake Michigan shore to the southwest corner of county.
  enters from Marquette County at the northwest corner of the county and runs southeasterly to intersection with US 41 at Gladstone.
  runs east–west across the southwestern tip of the county, entering from Menominee County at Schaffer and running southeasterly to an intersection with US 41 west of Narenta.
  runs from the southern tip of the Garden Peninsula at Fayette State Park to an intersection with US 2 at Garden Corners.

Airport
The county is served by Delta County Airport (KESC), southwest of Escanaba. It provides scheduled airline service to Detroit.

Government
Delta County was reliably Republican after the American Civil War, and until Franklin Roosevelt's New Deal. Since 1932, the Democratic Party nominee has carried the county vote in 15 of the 23 national presidential elections through 2020.

Delta County operates the County jail, maintains rural roads, operates the major local courts, records deeds, mortgages, and vital records, administers public health regulations, and participates with the state in the provision of social services. The county board of commissioners controls the budget and has limited authority to make laws or ordinances. In Michigan, most local government functions – police and fire, building and zoning, tax assessment, street maintenance etc. – are the responsibility of individual cities and townships.

Elected officials

 Prosecuting Attorney: Lauren Wickman
 Sheriff: Edward Oswald
 County Clerk/Register of Deeds: Nancy Przewrocki
 County Treasurer: Sherry Godfrey
 Drain Commissioner: George Maciejewski
 County Surveyor: Mel Davis
 Circuit Court Judge: John B. Economopoulos
 District Court Judge: Steven C. Parks
 Probate Court Judge: Perry R. Lund

(information as of September 2018)

Communities

Cities
 Escanaba (county seat)
 Gladstone

Village
 Garden

Civil townships

 Baldwin Township
 Bark River Township
 Bay de Noc Township
 Brampton Township
 Cornell Township
 Ensign Township
 Escanaba Township
 Fairbanks Township
 Ford River Township
 Garden Township
 Maple Ridge Township
 Masonville Township
 Nahma Township
 Wells Township

Unincorporated communities

 Bark River
 Brampton
 Chaison
 Fairport
 Fayette
 Ford River
 Garden Corners
 Harris
 Hyde
 Isabella
 Island View
 Kipling
 Lake Bluff
 Maplewood
 Nahma
 Narenta
 Perkins
 Perronville
 Rapid River
 Riverland
 Rock
 St. Nicholas
 Schaffer
 Wells
 West Gladstone

Indian reservations
 A small section of the Hannahville Indian Community, which has most of its territory in neighboring Menominee County to the west, extends into Bark River Township.
 The Sault Tribe of Chippewa Indians occupies a very small portion in the southwest city limits of Escanaba.

Education
School districts include:
 Bark River-Harris School District
 Big Bay de Noc School District
 Escanaba Area Public Schools
 Gladstone Area Schools
 Mid Peninsula School District
 Rapid River Public Schools

See also
 List of Michigan State Historic Sites in Delta County, Michigan
 National Register of Historic Places listings in Delta County, Michigan

References

External links
 Delta County government website
 Delta County Profile, Sam M Cohodas Regional Economist, Tawni Hunt Ferrarini, Ph.D.
 

 
Michigan counties
1861 establishments in Michigan
Populated places established in 1861